Batavia is an opera in three acts and a prologue by Richard Mills to a libretto by Peter Goldsworthy,
commissioned by Opera Australia. The plot is based on the historical events surrounding the Dutch
sailing ship Batavia.

The opera premiered on 11 May 2001 at the State Theatre (Melbourne) for the Centenary
of Federation Festival. It received three Helpmann Awards and six Green Room Awards.
The work lasts for about three hours and ten minutes with one interval. The CD recording was captured 
at the State Theatre, Victorian Arts Centre, Melbourne, on the 11 & 13 May 2001.

See also
 List of works about the Dutch East India Company

References

Whipping up a storm, composing Batavia: an interview with Richard Mills / Anna Goldsworthy. In: Context (Summer 2000/2001), Issue: 20, 43-50

External links

For a synopsis and review of the Melbourne premiere performance, see
 by Chris Boyd, 19 May 2001, Australian Financial Review.

For a synopsis and review of the Perth performance, see
 Could This Be The Great Australian Opera? by Sandra Bowdler, (February 2004).

For Bruce Martin's reflections on creating the role of Francisco Pelsaert, see
 If I can sing it, I'll do it by Vanessa Taylor (March 2006, Opera~Opera)

Operas
English-language operas
2001 operas
Batavia (1628 ship)
Operas by Richard Mills
Operas set in Australia
Operas set in the 17th century
Works about the Dutch East India Company